James Chambers is an American author, comic book writer, and member of the Horror Writers Association.

Biography
Chambers is a member of and volunteer for the Horror Writers Association and recipient of the 2012 HWA President's Richard Laymon Award and the 2016 HWA Silver Hammer Award. In 2018, he chaired StokerCon, the Horror Writers Association annual conference, and taught writing workshops at the HWA Horror University.

He was awarded the Bram Stoker Award for Best Graphic Novel in 2016 for Kolchak: the Night Stalker: The Forgotten Lore of Edgar Allan Poe and has been a finalist for the Bram Stoker Award three times. In 1995 and 1996, he collaborated with Leonard Nimoy as editor on the comic book series Leonard Nimoy's Primortals and Origins and with Majel Barrett Roddenberry while editing Gene Roddenberry's Lost Universe. He also edited Isaac Asimov's I*BOTS, a posthumous comic book series based on concepts by Isaac Asimov. He lives in New York, is a member of the Horror Writers Association New York Chapter, and coordinates the Night Terror series of horror readings in New York City.

Published Works

Anthology

 A New York State of Fright: Horror Stories from the Empire State eds. James Chambers, April Grey, and Robert Masterson, New York: Hippocampus Press, 2018. This fund-raising anthology benefitted Girls Write Now.

Collections
 On the Night Border, Bowie, MD: Raw Dog Screaming Press, 2019. ( PB;  HC)
 "The Engines of Sacrifice" - The Engines of Sacrifice. Colusa, CA: Dark Regions Press, 2011.; a collection of four Lovecraft-inspired novellas published by Dark Regions Press which Publishers Weekly described as "…chillingly evocative…" in a starred review.
 Resurrection House, Colusa, Calif.: Dark Regions Press, 2009.
 The Midnight Hour: Saint Lawn Hill and Other Tales, Baltimore, MD: Die, Monster, Die! Books, 2005.

Comics and Graphic Novels
  "The Origin of the Primortals, Part I" - Leonard Nimoy's Primortals: ORIGINS Vol. 1, No. 1 (1995). Boca Raton, FL: Tekno Comix/Big Entertainment.
  "The Origin of the Primortals, Part II" - Leonard Nimoy's Primortals: ORIGINS Vol. 1, No. 2 (1995). Boca Raton, FL: TeknoComix/Big Entertainment.
 "Cross Country: Part I" - Leonard Nimoy's Primortals Vol. 1, No. 13 (1995). Boca Raton, FL: TeknoComix/Big Entertainment.
 "Cross Country: Part II" - Leonard Nimoy's Primortals Vol. 1, No. 14 (1995). Boca Raton, FL: TeknoComix/Big Entertainment.
 "Cross Country: Part III" - Leonard Nimoy's Primortals Vol. 1, No. 15 (1995). Boca Raton, FL: TeknoComix/Big Entertainment.
 "Cross Country: World in Flames" - Leonard Nimoy's Primortals  Vol. 2, No. 0 (1996). Boca Raton, FL: TeknoComix/Big Entertainment.
 "Homecoming" - Leonard Nimoy's Primortals Vol. 2, No. 7 (1996). Boca Raton, FL: TeknoComix/Big Entertainment.
 "Lost Girl" - Shadow House Vol. 1, No. 1 (August, 1997). New York: Shadow House Press.
 "Black Coffin Death" - Shadow House Vol. 1, No. 2 (October, 1997). New York: Shadow House Press.
 "Swamp Thunder" - Shadow House Vol. 1, No. 3 (December, 1997). New York: Shadow House Press.
 "The Mourning After" - Shadow House Vol. 1, No. 4 (February, 1998). New York: Shadow House Press.
 "One Man's Nightmare, Another Man's Soul" - Shadow House Vol. 1, No. 5 (April, 1997). New York: Shadow House Press.
 "The Hand of Gorlak" - The Midnight Hour Vol. 1, No. 1 (August, 2004). Baltimore, MD: Die Monster Die Books.
 "The Demon Head of Harbuu Kisasi" - Negative Burn Vol. 2, No. 9 (January, 2007). Image Comics/Desperado Publishing.
 Kolchak the Night Stalker: The Forgotten Lore of Edgar Allan Poe, Moonstone Books, 2016. - This Bram Stoker Award-winning graphic novel featured Carl Kolchak of the television series in all-new stories inspired by the life and works of Edgar Allan Poe.

Novellas
 The Dead Bear Witness - Pennsville, NJ: eSpec Books, 2019, paperback; MD: Cemetery Dance, 2019, e-book; Dark Quest Books, Howell, NJ, 2012.; published in an earlier version as a chapbook, Baltimore, MD: Die, Monster, Die! Books, 2002 / Reprinted, The Dead Walk. Vincent Sneed, ed. Baltimore, MD: Die, Monster, Die! Books, 2004.
 Tears of Blood - Pennsville, NJ: eSpec Books, 2020,; Dark Quest Books, Howell, NJ, 2012.; published in an earlier version as "Crying Tears of Blood, Sweet Like Honey" in Bare Bone # 9. Kevin L. Donihe, ed. Raw Dog Screaming Press, November 2006.
 "The Dead, In Their Masses" - The Dead Walk Again. Vince Sneed, ed. Farmingdale, NY: Padwolf Publishing, 2007.
 "Investigation 37" - The Engines of Sacrifice. Colusa, CA: Dark Regions Press, 2011.
 "The Hidden Room" - The Engines of Sacrifice. Colusa, CA: Dark Regions Press, 2011.
 "The Ugly Birds" - The Engines of Sacrifice. Colusa, CA: Dark Regions Press, 2011.
 Three Chords of Chaos - Pennsville, NJ: eSpec Books, 2019,; Dark Quest Books, Howell, NJ, 2013..

Short fiction
 "The Ghost of the Bayou Pitenn" - Chiral Mad 4. Michael Bailey and Lucy A. Snyder, eds. Written Backwards, Calif., 2018.
 "A Manifest Destiny, or the Testament of a Continental Regular" - War Fear. Bruce Gehweiller, ed. Marietta, GA: Marietta Publishing, 2002. Paperback edition, 2008. (/978-1892669209)
 "A Wandering Blackness" - Lin Carter's Dr. Anton Zarnak, Occult Detective. Robert Price, ed. Marietta, GA: Marietta Publishing, 2002. - received an honorable mention in The Year's Best Fantasy and Horror, Sixteenth Annual Collection
 "Keeper of Beasts" - Lin Carter's Dr. Anton Zarnak, Occult Detective. Robert Price, ed. Marietta, GA: Marietta Publishing, 2002. 
 Mooncat Jack - Chapbook, Baltimore, MD: Die, Monster, Die! Books, 2002. / Reprinted, Resurrection House, Colusa, Calif.: Dark Regions Press, 2009. 
 "The Last Stand of Black Danny O'Barry" - Weird Trails. Michael Szymanski, ed. Lockport, NY: Triad Entertainment, 2002. / Reprinted, Resurrection House, Colusa, Calif.: Dark Regions Press, 2009. 
 "The Tale of the Spanish Prisoner" - WarFear. Bruce Gehweiller, ed. Marietta, GA: Marietta Publishing, 2002. Paperback edition, 2008. / Reprinted, Resurrection House, Colusa, Calif.: Dark Regions Press, 2009.
 "Trick" - Mooncat Jack, Chapbook, Baltimore, MD: Die, Monster, Die! Books, 2002. / Reprinted, No Longer Dreams. Danielle Ackley-McPhail, Lee Hillmann, L. Jagi Lamplighter, and Jeff Lyman, eds. Baltimore, MD: Lite Circle Books, 2005 / Reprinted, Resurrection House, Colusa, Calif.: Dark Regions Press, 2009.
 "Against the Stars Themselves" - The Black Book, January, 2003.
 "The Kind Old Fellow" - Sick: An Anthology of Illness. John Edward Lawson, ed. Baltimore, MD: Raw Dog Screaming Press, 2003.
 "Refugees" - Allen K's Inhuman. Allen Koszowski, ed. Baltimore, MD: Die, Monster, Die! Books, 2004. (w/ Vince Sneed). / Reprinted, Resurrection House, Colusa, Calif.: Dark Regions Press, 2009.
 "Resurrection House" - The Dead Walk. Vincent Sneed, ed. Baltimore, MD: Die, Monster, Die! Books, 2004./ Reprinted, Resurrection House, Colusa, Calif.: Dark Regions Press, 2009.
 "Blood & Water, Fang & Sting" - The Midnight Hour: Saint Lawn Hill and Other Tales.  Baltimore, MD: Die, Monster, Die! Books, 2005. - created in collaboration with artist Jason Whitley
 "Children of the Oneiroi" - The Midnight Hour: Saint Lawn Hill and Other Tales.  Baltimore, MD: Die, Monster, Die! Books, 2005.
 "Danse" (as Jan Rukh) - Dark Furies. Vincent Sneed, ed. Baltimore, MD: Die, Monster, Die! Books, 2005.
 "Gray Gulls Gyre" - Dark Furies. Vincent Sneed, ed. Baltimore, MD: Die, Monster, Die! Books, 2005. / Reprinted, Resurrection House, Colusa, Calif.: Dark Regions Press, 2009.
 "The Hand of Fate" - Chapbook, Baltimore, MD: Die, Monster, Die! Books, 2005 / Reprinted, The Midnight Hour: Saint Lawn Hill and Other Tales.  Baltimore, MD: Die, Monster, Die! Books, 2005. / Reprinted, R. Allen Leider's The Hellfire Lounge 2, Marietta, GA: Marietta Publishing, 2011.
 "Hot-Baked Hell" - The Midnight Hour: Saint Lawn Hill and Other Tales. Baltimore, MD: Die, Monster, Die! Books, 2005.
 "Law of the Kuzzi" - No Longer Dreams. Danielle Ackley-McPhail, Lee Hillmann, L. Jagi Lamplighter, and Jeff Lyman, eds. Baltimore, MD: Lite Circle Books, 2005. / Reprinted on SpaceWesterns.com, September 2007. / Reprinted in Cowboys in Space. Mike McPhail, ed., Louisville, CO: Copper Dog Publishing, 2016 (978-1943690091)
 "Picture Man" - Bare Bone # 7. Kevin L. Donihe, ed. Raw Dog Screaming Press, May 2005. 
 "Saint Lawn Hill" - The Midnight Hour: Saint Lawn Hill and Other Tales.  Baltimore, MD: Die, Monster, Die! Books, 2005.
 "The Blackburn Cairns" - The Midnight Hour: Saint Lawn Hill and Other Tales.  Baltimore, MD: Die, Monster, Die! Books, 2005.
 "The Blood of Demons" - The Midnight Hour: Saint Lawn Hill and Other Tales.  Baltimore, MD: Die, Monster, Die! Books, 2005.
 "Unhallowed Ground, Unholy Flesh" - Lost Worlds of Space and Time (Volume 1), Steven Lines, Ed., Calne, Wiltshire, UK: Rainfall Books, 2005.
 "Upon A Slender Stem" - Hear Them Roar. CJ Henderson and Patrick Thomas, eds. Spyre, 2006 (Reissued: Marietta, GA: Marietta Publishing, 2008); originally published in The Midnight Hour: Saint Lawn Hill and Other Tales.  Baltimore, MD: Die, Monster, Die! Books, 2005.
 "Young Demons" - At The Midnight Hour (.com), 2005.
 "Mosqueto" - Crypt-Critters (Volume 1). Bruce Gehweiller, ed. Farmingdale, NY: Padwolf Publishing, 2006.
 "The Feeding Things" - Cthulhu Sex # 23. Cthulhu Sex, February 2006. / Reprinted, Resurrection House, Colusa, Calif.: Dark Regions Press, 2009.
 "The Roaches in the Walls" - Hardboiled Cthulhu. James Ambeuhl, ed. Lake Orion, MI: Elder Signs Press, 2006.
 "An Account of Two Deaths" - Crypt-Critters (Volume 2). Bruce Gehweiller, ed. Farmingdale, NY: Padwolf Publishing, 2007.
 "Killer Eye" - Breach the Hull. (Defending the Future, Volume 1) Mike McPhail, ed. Marietta, GA: Marietta Publishing, 2007.
 "Sally Smiles" - Bad-Ass Faeries. Danielle Ackley-McPhail, Lee Hillmann, L. Jagi Lamplighter, and Jeff Lyman, eds. Marietta, GA: Marietta Publishing, 2007 / Reissued, Cincinnati, OH: Mundania Press, 2009.
 "Swamp Hoppers" - Crypto-Critters (Volume 2). Bruce Gehweiller, ed. Farmingdale, NY: Padwolf Publishing, 2007. / Reprinted, Resurrection House, Colusa, Calif.: Dark Regions Press, 2009 (Deluxe Edition hardcover only).
  "The Way of the Bone" - Bad-Ass Faeries 2: Just Plain Bad. Danielle Ackley-McPhail, Lee Hillmann, L. Jagi Lamplighter, and Jeff Lyman, eds. Marietta, GA: Marietta Publishing, 2008 / Reissued, Cincinnati, OH: Mundania Press, 2009.
 "Corporeal Gains" - R. Allen Leider's Hellfire Lounge, Marietta, GA: Marietta Publishing, 2009.
 "Derelict" - Resurrection House, Colusa, Calif.: Dark Regions Press, 2009 (Deluxe Edition hardcover only).
 "Five Points" - Resurrection House, Colusa, Calif.: Dark Regions Press, 2009.
 "The Devil, You Know" - Domino Lady: Sex as a Weapon. Lori Gentile, ed. Moonstone Books, 2009.
 "Vicious Swimmers" - Resurrection House, Colusa, Calif.: Dark Regions Press, 2009.
 "War Movies" - So It Begins. (Defending the Future, Volume 2) Mike McPhail, ed. Howell, NJ: Dark Quest Books, 2009.
 "Box Lunch" - New Blood. Diane Raetz and Patrick Thomas, eds. New York: Padwolf Publishing, 2010.
 "Faerie Ring Blues" - Bad-Ass Faeries 3: In All Their Glory. Danielle Ackley-McPhail, Lee Hillmann, L. Jagi Lamplighter, and Jeff Lyman, eds. Cincinnati, OH: Mundania Press, 2010.
 "Grilg Friendly" - Barbarians at the Jumpgate. Bruce Gehweiller, ed. New York: Padwolf Publishing, 2010.
 "Henkin's Last Lies" - Bad Cop, No Donut. John L. French, ed. New York: Padwolf Publishing, 2010.
 "He Who Burns" - Dragon's Lure. Danielle Ackley-McPhail, Jennifer Ross, and Jeffrey Lyman, eds. Howell, NJ: Dark Quest Books, 2010.
 "Topsy Turvy" - The Green Hornet Chronicles. Joe Gentile and Win Scott Eckert, eds. Calumet City, IL: Moonstone Entertainment, Inc., 2010.
 "House of Automatons" - In an Iron Cage. Danielle Ackley-McPhail, Elektra Hammond, and Neal Levin, eds. Howell, NJ: Dark Quest Books, 2011.
 "Mother of Peace" - By Other Means (Defending the Future, Volume 3) Mike McPhail, ed. Howell, NJ: Dark Quest Books, 2011.
 "Birch's Refugees" - The Dead Bear Witness (Corpse Fauna, volume 1), Dark Quest Books, Howell, NJ, 2012.
 "Dead-End Street" - Tears of Blood (Corpse Fauna, volume 2), Dark Quest Books, Howell, NJ, 2012.
 "I Am the Last" - Fantastic Futures 13. Robert E. Waters and James R. Stratton, ed. Farmingdale, NY: Padwolf Publishing, 2012.
 "Meet the Tuskersons" - Walrus Tales. Kevin L. Donihe, ed. Eraserhead Press, Portland, OR, 2012.
 "A Snowball's Chance in Purgatory" - To Hell in a Fast Car. John L. French, ed. Howell, NJ: Dark Quest Books, 2012.
 "Trade War" - Best Laid Plans (Defending the Future, Volume 5) Mike McPhail, ed. Howell, NJ: Dark Quest Books, 2012.
 "Upon Wave, Wind, and Tide" - Mermaids 13. John L. French, ed. Farmingdale, NY: Padwolf Publishing, 2012.
 "A Cat's Cry in Pluto's Kitchen" - Clockwork Chaos. Neal Levin and Danielle Ackley-McPhail, eds. Howell, NJ: Dark Quest Books, 2013.
 "Father of War" - Dogs of War (Defending the Future, Volume 6), Mike McPhail, ed. Howell, NJ: Dark Quest Books, 2013.
 "Lost Daughters" - Deep Cuts: Mayhem, Menace, Misery. Angel Leigh McCoy, E.S. Magill, and Chris Marrs, eds. Evil Jester Press, New York, 2013.
 "Mnemonicide" - Chiral Mad 2. Michael Bailey, ed. Written Backwards, Calif., 2013.
 "The Blood Eaters" - The Avenger: Roaring Heart of the Crucible. Nancy Holder and Joe Gentile, eds. Calumet City, IL: Moonstone Entertainment, Inc., 2013.
 "The Steel Tsars" - The Spider: Extreme Prejudice. Joe Gentile and Tommy Hancock, eds. Calumet City, IL: Moonstone Entertainment, Inc., 2013. (/978-1-936814-46-6)
 "Marco Polo" - Truth or Dare? Max Booth III, ed. Cibolo, TX: Perpetual Motion Machine Publishing, 2014.
 "The Price of Faces" - Qualia Nous. Michael Bailey, ed. Written Backwards, Calif., 2014.
 "Super-Villain Showcase #53: Enter the Deep Loa" - With Great Power. John L. French and Greg Schauer, eds. Howell, NJ: Dark Quest Books, 2014.
 "Tell It to the Judge" - TV Gods. Jeff Young and Lee C. Hillman, eds. Fortress Publishing, Inc., 2014.
 "The Flying Rock" - Bad-Ass Faeries 4: It's Elemental. Danielle Ackley-McPhail, Lee Hillmann, L. Jagi Lamplighter, and Jeff Lyman, eds. Howell, NJ: Dark Quest Books, 2014.
 "Eight Million Strong" - The Side of Good. Danielle Ackley-McPhail and Greg Schauer, eds. Pennsville, NJ: eSpec Books, 2015.
 "Every Second of Every Day" - The Society for the Preservation of CJ Henderson. Danielle Ackley-McPhail and Greg Schauer, eds. Stratford, NJ: eSpec Books, 2015.
 "Odd Quahogs" - Shadows Over Main Street. Doug Murano and D. Alexander Ward, eds. Hazardous Press, 2015.
 "The Last Great Monologue of Evil Intent" - The Side of Evil. Danielle Ackley-McPhail and Greg Schauer, eds. Pennsville, NJ: eSpec Books, 2015.
 "The Monster with My Fist for Its Head" - Reel Dark. L. Andrew Cooper and Pamela Turner, eds. BlackWyrm Publishing, 2015.
 "In Wolf's Clothing" - Gaslight & Grimm: Steampunk Faerie Tales. Danielle Ackley-McPhail and Diana Bastine, eds. Stratford, NJ: eSpec Books, 2016.
 "The Lost Boy" - Kolchak the Night Stalker: Passages of the Macabre. Dave Ulanski and Tracey Hill, eds. Lockport, IL: Moonstone Books, 2016.
 "The Many Hands Inside the Mountain" - Dark Hallows II: Tales from the Witching Hour. Mark Parker, ed. Scarlet Galleon Publications, 2016.
 "A Night at Odd Angels'" - Kolchak the Night Stalker: The Forgotten Lore of Edgar Allan Poe, Moonstone Books, 2016.
 "The Meth Moths of Kraken Mare" - Man and Machine (Defending the Future, Volume 7). Mike McPhail, ed. Stratford, NJ: eSpec Books, 2017.
 "A Song Left Behind in the Aztakea Hills" - Shadows Over Main Street, Volume 2. Doug Murano and D. Alexander Ward, eds. Winchester, VA: Cutting Block Books, 2017.
 "The Star Gazers" - If We Had Known (Beyond The Cradle). Mike McPhail, ed. Stratford, NJ: eSpec Books, 2017.
 "A Feast for Dead Horses" - After Punk: Steampowered Tales of the After Life. Danielle Ackley-McPhail and Greg Schauer, eds. Pennsville, NJ: eSpec Books, 2018.
 "A Beach on Nellus" - In Harm's Way, (Defending the Future, Volume 8) Pennsville, NJ: eSpec Books, 2019.
 "Echoes from the Ice" - Mountains of Madness Revealed. Darrell Schweitzer, ed. UK: PS Publishing, 2019.
 "The Black Box" - Footprints in the Stars. Pennsville, NJ: eSpec Books, 2019.
 "The Chamber of Last Earthly Delights" - On the Night Border. Bowie, MD: Raw Dog Screaming Press, 2019. ( PB;  HC)
 "The Driver Under a Cheshire Moon" - On the Night Border. Bowie, MD: Raw Dog Screaming Press, 2019. ( PB;  HC)
 "Feed the Fair Folk Sweet" - Three Chords of Chaos, Pennsville, NJ: eSpec Books, 2019,
 "Living/Dead" - On the Night Border. Bowie. MD: Raw Dog Screaming Press, 2019. ( PB;  HC)
 "Red Mami" - On the Night Border. Bowie, MD: Raw Dog Screaming Press, 2019. ( PB;  HC)
 "Right of Crossing" - The Pulp Horror Book of Phobias. MJ Sydney, ed. Tacoma, Wash.: Lycan Valley Press, 2019.
 "Sum'bitch and the Arakadile" - On the Night Border. Bowie, MD: Raw Dog Screaming Press, 2019. ( PB;  HC)
 "The Fire-Proof Man Is Dead" - Realmscapes: Heroes of the Realm, ed. Danielle Ackley-McPhail, Pottstown, PA: Realm Makers Media, 2019,
 "What's in the Bag, Dad?" - On the Night Border. Bowie, MD: Raw Dog Screaming Press, 2019. ( PB;  HC)

See also
List of horror fiction authors

References

External links
 
 
 

1970 births
Living people
20th-century American novelists
21st-century American novelists
American horror writers
American thriller writers
American comics writers
20th-century American short story writers
21st-century American short story writers
Cthulhu Mythos writers
Fordham University alumni
21st-century American male writers